Costantino Patrizi Naro JUD (4 September 1798 – 17 December 1876) was a long-serving Italian Cardinal who became Dean of the College of Cardinals. Cardinal Benedetto Naro was his great-uncle.

Biography
Born in Siena, Naro was educated in the Collegio dei Protonotari, at Rome. He studied for and was awarded a doctorate in utroque iure. He was ordained in 1819. He worked as a judge (auditor) of the Roman Rota.  

He was appointed titular archbishop of Philippi on 15 December 1828 by Pope Leo XII. He was consecrated on 21 December by Cardinal Carlo Odescalchi, assisted by Lorenzo Mattei, and by Paolo Agosto Foscolo. He was appointed Nuncio to the Grand Duchy of Tuscany on 16 January 1829. He remained in Tuscany until he was appointed as Prefect of the Apostolic Palace on 2 July 1832 by Pope Gregory XVI.  

He was created cardinal, but only in pectore, in the consistory of 23 June 1834 and publicly proclaimed on 11 July 1836, becoming Cardinal-Priest of San Silvestro in Capite. He was appointed Prefect of the Sacred Congregation of Bishops and Regulars on 6 July 1839. He was archpriest of the Basilica di Santa Maria Maggiore, from 1845 to 1867. He participated in the conclave of 1846 that elected Pope Pius IX. He opted for the order of bishops, taking the suburbicarian see of Albano, on 20 April 1849. In 1858 he and King Ferdinand II reiterated a petition to the Pope for the authorization of the worship of the Seven Archangels. Pope Pius IX. appointed him as Secretary of the Congregation of the Roman and Universal Inquisition in 1860. He served as Archpriest of the patriarchal Lateran basilica, from 1867 until his death. He also served as Dean of the Sacred College of Cardinals from 1870 until his death in 1876.

References

External links
Biography
Catholic Hierarchy page

1798 births
1876 deaths
People from Siena
19th-century Italian cardinals
Deans of the College of Cardinals
Cardinal-bishops of Albano
Cardinal-bishops of Ostia
Cardinal-bishops of Porto
Cardinals created by Pope Gregory XVI
Prefects of the Papal Household
Cardinal Vicars
Members of the Holy Office